Cristina Businari (born 10 October 1949) is a former Italian actress, publicist and model.

She won Miss Italia in 1967. She played Mercedes along Craig Hill in I Want Him Dead (1968), by Paolo Bianchini, and Gianna in I ragazzi della Roma violenta (1976), by Renato Savino.

Filmography
 I racconti fantastici di Edgar Allan Poe (1979) as Myrna
 The Children of Violent Rome (1976) as Gianna
 Der gestohlene Himmel (1974)
 I Want Him Dead (1968) as Mercedes

References

External links

 

1949 births
20th-century Italian actresses
Italian female models
20th-century Italian journalists
21st-century Italian journalists
Miss Universe 1968 contestants
Living people
Models from Rome
21st-century Italian women